Infringement refers to the violation of a law or a right.

Infringement may refer to:

 Infringement procedure, a European Court of Justice procedure to determine whether a Member State has fulfilled its obligations under Union law
 Intellectual property infringement, violating an owner's exclusive rights to intangible assets such as musical, literary, or artistic works
Copyright infringement, the use of works under copyright, including reproducing, distributing, displaying, or performing the copyrighted work without permission
Patent infringement, using or selling a patented invention without permission from the patent holder, typically for commercial purposes
Trademark infringement, a violation of the exclusive rights attaching to a trademark without the authorization of the trademark owner or licensees
 Secondary infringement, when a party contributes to or is responsible for infringing acts carried out by another party
 Summary offence or infraction, a crime that can be proceeded against without a jury trial and/or indictment in some jurisdictions

See also
 Infringement Festival, an international, interdisciplinary critical arts festival that challenges the commodification of culture
 Violation (disambiguation)

fi:Oikeudenloukkaus